Ian Maurice Haig  (13 December 193510 March 2014) was an Australian public servant and diplomat.

Life and career
Born in Perth on 13 December 1935, Haig moved with his mother and brother to Adelaide as a young boy when his father enlisted to serve in the 2nd AIF.  He was educated at Pulteney Grammar School before going on to study for a Bachelor of Arts at the University of Adelaide.

In February 1974, Haig was appointed Australia's first Ambassador to Saudi Arabia. In August 1975, Haig was also appointed non-resident Australian Ambassador to the United Arab Emirates.

In 1978, Haig was one of 20 who contested for Liberal Party pre-selection for the New South Wales Senate vacancy created when Sir Robert Cotton retired. He was unsuccessful securing the nomination by just one vote.

In 1986, Haig was chairman of Power International, a technology company.

Haig was made a Member of the Order of Australia in 1988 for his services to international relations.

References

1935 births
2014 deaths
Ambassadors of Australia to Saudi Arabia
Ambassadors of Australia to the United Arab Emirates
Agents-General for Victoria
Members of the Order of Australia
University of Adelaide alumni